Dominica competed at the 2020 Summer Olympics in Tokyo. Originally scheduled to take place from 24 July to 9 August 2020, the Games have been postponed to 23 July to 8 August 2021, because of the COVID-19 pandemic. It was the nation's seventh appearance at the Summer Olympics.

Competitors
The following is the list of number of competitors participating in the Games:

Athletics

Dominican athletes further achieved the entry standards, either by qualifying time or by world ranking, in the following track and field events (up to a maximum of 3 athletes in each event):

Track & road events

Field events

See also
Dominica at the 2019 Pan American Games

References

Nations at the 2020 Summer Olympics
2020
Olympics